Nick Davis is a former wide receiver in the National Football League. He played two seasons with the Minnesota Vikings. He played college football at the University of Wisconsin-Madison.

Career statistics

Return

References

People from Manchester, Michigan
Minnesota Vikings players
American football wide receivers
Wisconsin Badgers football players
1979 births
Living people
Scottish Claymores players